USS Martha Washington (ID‑3019) was a transport for the United States Navy during World War I named for Martha Washington, the first First Lady of the United States. She was originally ocean liner SS Martha Washington for the Austro-American Line before the war. Before and after her Navy service she was the United States Army transport USAT Martha Washington. The liner was sold to the Italian Cosulich Line in 1922. In 1932, when Cosulich was absorbed into Italia Flotte Riunite, the ship was renamed SS Tel Aviv. The ship was scrapped in 1934.

Early career 

Martha Washington was launched in 1908 by Russell & Co. of Port Glasgow, Scotland for the Austro-American Line (formal name: Unione Austriaca di Navigazione). The liner sailed between Trieste and New York City.

On the evening of 20 November 1911, while steaming in the Ionian Sea from Patras and headed for New York, Martha Washington came under fire from an Italian battleship for a period of ten minutes, with shells falling within one ship length (approximately ) of the liner. According to the captain of the liner, the Italians, fighting against Turkey in the Italo-Turkish War, mistook Martha Washington for a Turkish ship. The ship was allowed to pass unharmed after the crew used a signal lamp to communicate her identity to the Italians.

At the outbreak of World War I, Martha Washington was interned at Hoboken, New Jersey, in 1914.

World War I 
After the United States entered the war, Martha Washington was taken over by the U.S. Army Quartermaster Department on 6 April 1917. The former liner was acquired by the Navy in November 1917. She was commissioned on 2 January 1918.

Transporting troops to France 
Two months of round‑the‑clock effort restored the ship to seaworthiness and modified her as a troop transport. Martha Washington sailed on eight wartime voyages carrying troops to France, embarking a total of 24,005 passengers. Martha Washington arrived back at New York on 14 March. Martha Washington and Powhatan returned to the U.S. on 22 April.

Martha Washington next departed Newport News on 30 April 1918 with Powhatan. Martha Washington returned to Virginia on 1 June. Martha Washington returned to the U.S. on 30 June.

Aeolus and Matsonia joined Martha Washington in arriving in Virginia on 5 August.

With Manchuria, Henderson, Aeolus, and steamer , Martha Washington sailed from Newport News for France on 14 August.  and Matsonia, sailing from New York, joined the convoy, which was escorted by cruisers , Seattle, and Frederick. Records of this convoy are sketchy, but Henderson and Matsonia are known to have arrived in France on 25 August, and the other ships probably arrived around that same time. Upon Martha Washington 's return to the U.S. she shifted to New York.

Finland and Pocahontas accompanied Martha Washington on her return journey and arrived at New York on 12 October.

Beginning what would be her final wartime crossing, Martha Washington sailed with Aeolus and Italian steamer  on 21 October from Newport News. Navy transport Pocahontas and Brazilian steamer , sailing from New York, and escorts New Hampshire, South Dakota, and  filled out the convoy, which arrived on 4 November. Returning to the U.S. five days after the Armistice, Martha Washington made eight additional voyages—from 26 November 1918 to 11 November 1919—returning 19,687 troops and passengers from foreign ports. During her seventh voyage she also disembarked 945 interned German aliens at Rotterdam in the Netherlands.

On her final voyage she arrived at Brest on 14 August and received new orders to transport an American relief mission to Turkey and Russia. Under the leadership of Major General James Harbord, U.S. Army, the mission spent the first two weeks in September at Constantinople and after arriving at Batum, Russia, on 18 September, spent the following three weeks there. In this period of civil turmoil, Martha Washington brought 324 Armenian and Polish refugees to Constantinople. Sailing for the United States on 15 October, she called at Malta, Marseille, and Brest before arriving at New York on the first anniversary of the Armistice signing. She was decommissioned on 18 November 1919 and was turned over to the War Department.

Later career 
In November 1922, Martha Washington was sold to the Cosulich Line. Around the time that line was absorbed into the state-owned Italia Flotte Riunite in 1932, Martha Washington was renamed Tel Aviv. The liner was scrapped in 1934.

Notes

References

External links 
 
 

Ships built on the River Clyde
Ocean liners
World War I passenger ships of Austria-Hungary
World War I auxiliary ships of the United States
Transport ships of the United States Army
Transports of the United States Navy
Passenger ships of Italy
1908 ships